José Aranguren (1875 – 22 April 1939) was a Republican general during the Spanish Civil War. From Ferrol, he commanded the Guardia Civil. After the Nationalist victory, he was court-martialed and sentenced to death, being executed by firing squad in Barcelona.

References
 THOMAS, Hugh, Historia de la Guerra Civil Española. Círculo de Lectores, Barcelona, 1976. .
 Ramón Salas Larrazábal, Historia del Ejército Popular de la República. La Esfera de los Libros S.L.

External links
 Biografía del General Aranguren

1875 births
1939 deaths
Spanish military personnel of the Spanish Civil War (Republican faction)
People executed by firing squad
Executed military leaders
People from A Coruña
Executed Spanish people
Spanish Civil War in Catalonia
People executed by Francoist Spain